Beverly Hills is the name of two communities in the U.S. state of West Virginia.

Beverly Hills, a neighborhood of Huntington, West Virginia
Beverly Hills, Marion County, West Virginia